Louis Berger (14 April 1914 – 14 August 1996) was an American civil engineer. A graduate of Tufts College, Berger received his Master's degree in soils and geology from MIT and Doctorate in soil mechanics from Northwestern. He was a former faculty member of Pennsylvania State University's engineering department which designed a large portion of the Pennsylvania Turnpike. After completion of the contract, he opened a second office which often employed local labor to fulfill international contracts. He was involved in designing and building highways, railroads, bridges, and airfields in 120 countries. His company grew to become the Louis Berger Group.

In 1994, Berger designed the world's longest car bridge (at the time) in Thailand, The Bang Na Expressway. It held the title of the world's longest bridge from 2000 until 2004. Today, it is the 6th longest bridge in the world.

References

Louis Berger's biography on The Louis Berger Group's website.

American transportation businesspeople
Massachusetts Institute of Technology School of Science alumni
Tufts University alumni
Tufts University School of Engineering alumni
Northwestern University alumni
American civil engineers
1914 births
1996 deaths
20th-century American businesspeople
20th-century American engineers